General elections were held in Uruguay on 30 November 1930. The various factions of the Colorado Party received the most votes in the elections for the President and National Administration Council.

Results

References

Elections in Uruguay
Uruguay
General
Uruguay
Election and referendum articles with incomplete results